Holyman was an Australian company that operated cargo ships and ferries in Australia and other countries. The company had three divisions; Domestic shipping and transport services, Ferries and Bulk commodity handling.

The company was founded in 1994 when the Shipping and Development Division of TNT was spun-off and floated on the Australian Securities Exchange. Assets in the original float included a gas pipeline, a coal loading terminal, bulk ore carriers, bulk sugar carriers, a 50% interest in Condor Ferries, and premium commuter ferry service, Express Navigation in New York.

Not long after the float, the company expanded its presence in the fast ferry industry by taking a 75% stake in Cat-Link, a start-up ferry operation in Denmark. The fast car ferry revolutionised transport in Denmark, and the start-up took at 25% market share during its first summer season.

In the same year, it redeployed one of its fast ferries to New Zealand during the Northern Winter / Southern Summer, operating from Wellington to Picton.

The company also expanded its US holdings by acquiring a stake in Catalina Cruises, which operated ferries between Long Beach and Avalon in California. To take that holding, Holyman devised an innovative ownership approach, delivering effective financial and management control, while still remaining within the highly restrictive Jones and Passenger Services Acts, laws that prevent foreign ownership of US Domestic shipping interests. The intention was to replicate that structure in investment in other lucrative US domestic ferry opportunities.

In 1997, Holyman over-reached, acquiring a 67% interest in Sally Line, which operated an English Channel ferry between Ramsgate, England and Ostend, Belgium. It replaced the conventional vehicular ferry with a fast Incat built ferry.

For a brief time, at its apogee, Holyman was the world's leading fast vehicle ferry operator.

The Holyman Sally route was unable to attract sufficient revenue to make the service profitable. Weather conditions and technical issues with the Incat vessel also hampered operations, and ten months after Holyman Sally commenced, the company was in trouble. The poor financial performance of Holyman Sally was almost identical to financial projections prepared during the early analysis of the route's viability by Holyman's development team but these early analyses were dismissed as being too conservative, and the Managing Director pressed on with the project.

At the same time, marketing inertia from local management, coupled with technical and environmental issues, meant Cat-Link also began to lose money.

In July 1999, Adsteam made a takeover offer for Holyman. In October 1999, Lang Corporation made a counter takeover offer that was successfully completed in 2000. It was delisted from the Australian Securities Exchange on 25 January 2000.

History
1994: Founded when the Shipping and Development Division of TNT was spun-off
1995: Acquired Townsend Deliveries
1995: Commenced Cat-Link fast car ferry operation between Aarhus and Kalundborg in Denmark
1996: Acquired 50% stake in Catalina Cruises, Long Beach, California
1997: Commenced joint fast car ferry operation with Sally Line
1998: 50% stake in Condor Ferries sold to Commodore Shipping
1999: 50% stake in Hoverspeed sold to Sea Containers
1999: American ferry operator Express Navigation sold to Sea Containers
2000: Holyman acquired by Lang Corporation

References

Companies based in Melbourne
Companies formerly listed on the Australian Securities Exchange
Shipping companies of Australia
Australian companies established in 1994
Australian companies disestablished in 2000